Smalahove (also called smalehovud, sau(d)ehau(d) or skjelte) is a Western Norwegian traditional dish made from a sheep's head, originally eaten before Christmas. The name of the dish comes from the combination of the Norwegian words hove and smale. Hove is a dialectal form of hovud, meaning "head" (cf. Hǫfuð), and smale is a word for sheep, so smalahove literally means "sheep head". The skin and fleece of the head are torched, the brain removed, and the head is salted, sometimes smoked, and dried. The head is boiled or steamed for about three hours, and served with mashed rutabaga and potatoes. It is also traditionally served with akevitt. In some preparations, the brain is cooked inside the skull and then eaten with a spoon or fried. Originally, smalahove was typically eaten by the poor.

Traditional consumption
One serving usually consists of one half of a head. The ear and eye are normally eaten first, as they are the fattiest areas and are best eaten warm. The head is often eaten from the front to the back, working around the bones of the skull.

Legality

Since 1998 and the mad cow epidemics, an EU directive forbids the production of smalahove from adult sheep, due to fear of the possibility of transmission of scrapie, a deadly, degenerative prion disease of sheep and goats, though scrapie does not appear to be transmissible to humans. It is now allowed to be produced only from the heads of lambs.

Tourism
Smalahove is considered by most people to be unappealing or even repulsive. It is enjoyed mostly by enthusiasts, and is often served to tourists.  Because of its status as an "extreme" food, tourists often seek it out as a thrill. Voss, Norway in particular has benefited from tourists wishing to try it, "not only as a nostalgic and authentic rural dish, but also as a challenging culinary trophy appealing to thrill-seeking consumers."

See also 

 Svið
 Kale Pache
 List of lamb dishes
 List of smoked foods
 Powsowdie
 Smokie (food)

References

Lamb dishes
Christmas food
Norwegian cuisine
Offal
Smoked meat